Lands railway station served the hamlet of Low Lands, County Durham, England, from 1858 to 1872 on the Haggerleases branch of the Stockton and Darlington Railway.

History
The station was opened on 13 October 1858 by the Stockton and Darlington Railway. Trains initially ran every day but services were reduced to Thursdays and Saturdays after Evenwood was resited in May 1864. The station closed on 1 May 1872.

References

Disused railway stations in County Durham
Railway stations in Great Britain opened in 1858
Railway stations in Great Britain closed in 1872
1858 establishments in England
1872 disestablishments in England